The Himachal Pradesh Council of Ministers is the executive wing of Government of Himachal Pradesh and headed by Chief Minister of Himachal Pradesh, who is the head of government and leader of the state cabinet. The term of every executive wing is for 5 years. The council of ministers are assisted by department secretaries attached to each ministry who are from IAS Himachal Pradesh Cadre. The chief executive officer responsible for issuing orders on behalf of government is Chief Secretary to the state government.

Constitutional requirement

For the Council of Ministers to aid and advise Governor 
According to Article 163 of the Indian Constitution,

This means that the Ministers serve under the pleasure of the Governor and he/she may remove them, on the advice of the Chief Minister, whenever they want.

For other provisions as to Ministers 
According to Article 164 of the Indian Constitution,

Council of Ministers

Former Ministers

29 July 2020:Three New Cabinet Ministers Inducted
1 August 2020:Portfolios Have Been Reshuffled

References

Politics of Himachal Pradesh